Aleksandra Wójcik or Alexandra Wojcik may refer to:

 Aleksandra Wójcik (volleyball) (born 1994), Polish volleyball player
 Alexandra Wójcik (gymnast) (born 1985), Polish rhythmic gymnast